Hylarana spinulosa, also known as fine-spined frog and spiny frog, is a species of true frog, family Ranidae. It is endemic to Hainan, southern China. Breeding takes place in pools and slow-flowing streams.

References

spinulosa
Frogs of China
Endemic fauna of Hainan
Amphibians described in 1923
Taxa named by Malcolm Arthur Smith